The Aflac Building, located in Columbus, Georgia, was ordered in late November 1974, the groundbreaking ceremony took place January 4, 1975, and the tower was complete and occupied on December 19, 1975. The tower is the tallest building in the U.S. state of Georgia outside of the Atlanta Metropolitan Area,  Savannah, and Augusta. It Is located about 1 mile east of downtown. The building is 246 feet (75 m) tall. It serves as the headquarters for Aflac, an insurance company. The tower was to modernize the downtown Columbus area along with the Columbus government center built a year earlier.

References
Emporis.com. Retrieved 11-18-11.
Aflac.com. Retrieved 12-03-10.

Skyscrapers in Georgia (U.S. state)
Buildings and structures in Columbus, Georgia
Skyscraper office buildings in Georgia (U.S. state)
Insurance company headquarters in the United States
Office buildings completed in 1975
1975 establishments in Georgia (U.S. state)